Hexyl aminolevulinate hydrochloride, sold under the brand names Cysview and Hexvix, is an imaging agent that lights up under blue light during a blue light cystoscopy. It is used to help detect non-muscle invasive bladder cancer (NMIBC), in particular papillary tumors and carcinoma in situ (CIS).

In 2016, the American Urological Association (AUA) made the following statement with respect to NMIBC: 
 "In a patient with a history of NMIBC with normal cystoscopy and positive cytology, a clinician should consider prostatic urethral biopsies and upper tract imaging, as well as enhanced cystoscopic techniques (blue light cystoscopy, when available), ureteroscopy, or random bladder biopsies. (Expert Opinion)"
 "In a patient with NMIBC, a clinician should offer blue light cystoscopy at the time of TURBT, if available, to increase detection and decrease recurrence. (Moderate Recommendation; Evidence Strength: Grade B)."

It made by Photocure ASA, a Norwegian pharmaceutical company.

References

Oncology